Ephraim Avea Nsoh is a Ghanaian politician and was the Upper East Regional Minister of Ghana. Prior to heading the Upper East Region, Ephraim Avea Nsoh was Upper West Regional Minister. He was appointed as Principal of the College of Languages Education, University of Education. The appointment was a four year contract which took effect from October 1, 2016.

References

Living people
National Democratic Congress (Ghana) politicians
Year of birth missing (living people)